Tunisia (TUN) competed at the 1991 Mediterranean Games in Athens, Greece.

Nations at the 1991 Mediterranean Games
1991
Mediterranean Games